Tiger Media Limited; established in 2014 is a Bangladeshi movie production and distribution company. It specializes in film production, and distribution. It has emerged as one of the leading production companies within a year by producing some of the biggest Bangladeshi Films of 2014. Tiger Media Limited also owns Dhallywood24; A news division based on Bangladeshi Cinema.

Films produced and distributed by Tiger Media

Following are the list of notable films produced and distributed by Tiger Media Limited.

Music Label

 Action Jasmine (2015)
 Dui Prithibi (2015)
 Kistimaat (2015)
 Hero: The Superstar (2015)
 Shopno Je Tui (2015)
 Warning (2015)
 Black Money (2015)
 Samraat: The King Is Here (2016)
 Sweetheart (2016)
 Musafir (2016)
 Etota Bhalobashi (2016) - Television Film

See also
 Cinema of Bangladesh
 Indo-Bangladesh Joint Venture
 Jaaz Multimedia
 The Abhi Pictures
 Fatman Films
 Nayan-Apon Production

References

Film production companies of Bangladesh
Mass media companies of Bangladesh
Mass media companies established in 2014
Bangladeshi companies established in 2014